Lindsay Farris is an Australian / Maori actor, writer, producer, musician and voice over artist.

Career

Stage Work 
Farris has an extensive background in Australian theatre. Having worked for several leading Australian theatre companies. Some include the Sydney Theatre Company under Cate Blanchett and Andrew Upton's Artistic Direction, La Boite Theatre Company, Ensemble Theatre, Belvoir St Theatre, The Production Company and Christine Dunstan Productions.  

Farris' theatre credits include the critically acclaimed title role of Hamlet in Sport For Jove Theatre Company production at the Seymour Centre for which he received a 2012 Sydney Theatre Award nomination for Best Actor in a Leading Role in an Independent Production. Farris received rave reviews with iconic Sydney arts reviewer and co-founder of the Sydney Theatre Awards Diana Simmonds stating "Lindsay Farris' Hamlet is the most electrifying, memorable, sustained and intelligent realisation of the tragic Prince of Denmark I've ever seen".  In 2011 he appeared in the Australian premiere of Anthony Neilson's play Edward Gant's Amazing Feats of Loneliness, a co-production between the Sydney Theatre Company and La Boite Theatre Company.

Farris appeared as Dakin in the  Alan Bennett play The History Boys at the Sydney Opera House.

In May 2013 Farris reprised his critically acclaimed role of the Danish Prince in Sport For Jove Theatre Company's return season of Hamlet. Farris appeared in Noises Off and Mojo, both for Sydney Theatre Company.

Farris was founder and Artistic Director of the National Youth Theatre Company.

Film and Television
Farris appeared in Peter Templeman's 2005 short film Splintered, which won the Grand Jury Prize for Best Narrative Short at the Slamdance Film Festival in 2005, making it a contender for the Academy Award for Best Live Action Short Film (Live Action).

In 2009 Farris appeared in Rene Hernandez’s short film The Ground Beneath, which was also nominated for the Academy Award for Best Short Film.

Farris starred in the Joseph Sims feature film Bad Behaviour alongside John Jarratt. The film was selected as the closing night feature for the 2010 Melbourne Underground Film Festival, and received five awards including Best Actor for Lindsay. Bad Behaviour also appeared at the 2011 Cinequest Film Festival, making its North American premiere and has since appeared at Cannes and Another Hole in the Head Festival in San Francisco.

In 2010 Farris worked alongside Sunny Abberton to develop a documentary on youth theatre in Australia. Lindsay is also Executive Director of The Australian Ministry of Theatre, a company dedicated to the development of cultural initiatives for the sustainability of theatre practitioners and audiences.

In 2015 Lindsay worked alongside Geoffrey Rush, Nikolaj Coster Waldau, Brenton Thwaites and Gerard Butler on Gods of Egypt for Lionsgate Entertainment. Prior to this, Farris appeared in the Australian component of Geography of the Heart. He also worked with Alan Ball's HBO show Virtuoso executive produced by Elton John and David Furnish, and appeared as Dom Loneragan on Home and Away for The Seven Network. Farris also co-produced and starred in Observance, Joseph Sims-Dennett's second feature film, alongside John Jarratt and Brendan Cowell. Observance went to Cinequest Film Festival, Fantasia International Film Festival  and BFI London Film Festival.

In 2017 Lindsay appeared in PBS civil war drama Mercy Street for Scott Free Productions and Carl Logan in Sisters for Endemol Shine Australia.

In 2018 he appears as Dalton, a member of the Knights of Sumeria in Ash vs Evil Dead alongside Lucy Lawless and Bruce Campbell, executive produced by Sam Raimi, Robert Tapert and Bruce Campbell.

In 2019 he appeared again alongside Lucy Lawless in CJZ's My Life Is Murder for Acorn TV and Network TEN.

Directing and Writing
Farris has taught regularly at Newtown High School of the Performing Arts and has worked with students in performing arts at primary, secondary and tertiary schools across Australia including National Institute of Dramatic Arts and Western Australian Academy of Performing Arts.

Farris is a regular lecturer at intensive education programs, including the NSW State Drama Camp, NSW Riverina School's Drama Camp, Big Day Out, National Institute of Dramatic Art Young Actors Studio, NSW State Drama Company and NSW State Drama Ensemble. He also lectures regularly at schools and community centers on the importance of film, theatre, acting, and drama in education.

Farris wrote the screenplay for Untitled Lindsay Farris Project, for which he was shortlisted for the 2018 Screencraft Pilot Launch Competition  and was a finalist for the 2019 Inroads Screenwriting Fellowship and Table Read My Screenplay Competition. Farris has also written the stage plays Sugar Bowl and Touch.

Farris is also author of the novel, A Young Actor's Guide to Becoming a Wanker.

Music
Farris is a pianist, who has performed in venues around Australia including the Sydney Opera House, Vanguard, Metro and The Spanish Club.

Charity work
Farris was co-founder and Chair of the National Youth Theatre Company Foundation.

Credits

Theatre

Filmography

Awards and nominations

References

Further reading
"A prince of players", Lauren Murada, Inner West Courier, 21 June 2012, p. Cover, 2 and 33 – Lindsay Farris on playing Hamlet in Sport For Jove Theatre Company's 2012 production
"Only The Lonely", Matt O'Neill, Time Off, 18 May 2011, p 28: Interview for Edward Gant's Amazing Feats of Loneliness (La Boite Theatre Company and Sydney Theatre Company)
"Leading by example" Garrett Bithell, AX National, 7 May 2009, p 3, 20–21: Interview about Lindsay Farris' career to date and in the future
"Pulling no punches" Garrett Bithell, SX, 9 July 2009, p Cover and 13, Cover story and feature interview to promote The Little Dog Laughed for the Ensemble Theatre
"Schizophrenia's long and difficult journey", Ron Cerabona, The Canberra Times, May 2007, interview for 1 in 100/ Inside Out
"Actors seek a deeper meaning in their work", The Glebe, 6 July 2006, p 15 – Lindsay Farris on being a young Australian actor
"Acting on an Ambition" Vanessa Santer, mX 9 February 2006 – on NIDA Young Actors Studio

External links

 Splintered
 Blake, Elissa (February 2013). "School of thought". The Sydney Morning Herald, p 11 
 Hook Chris (9 June 2012). "To be or not to be". The Daily Telegraph, Best Weekend, p 4
 Webster, Samuel (26 June 2012). "Shakespeare’s Real Jester: Lindsay Farris on playing Hamlet". Mood of Monk.

1985 births
Living people
Australian male film actors
Australian male stage actors
Australian male television actors
Australian dramatists and playwrights
People educated at Newtown High School of the Performing Arts
21st-century Australian male actors
21st-century Australian male musicians
21st-century Australian musicians